Arumugam Ponnu Rajah  (7 July 1911 – 28 September 1999), also known as A. P. Rajah, was a Singaporean judge, diplomat and politician who served as Speaker of the Parliament of Singapore between 1964 and 1966.

Rajah also served as Singapore High Commissioner to the United Kingdom and later Singapore High Commissioner to Australia. 

He was Singapore's first Supreme Court judge to remain on the bench after turning 70.

Education
Rajah received his early education at St. Paul's Institution and Raffles Institution. In 1932, he attended University of Oxford where he received a law degree. He was later conferred the Honorary Degree of Doctor of Laws by the National University of Singapore (NUS) on 14 November 1984.

Career
In 1948, Rajah contested in the Legislative Council of Singapore for Rural West Constituency as a Progressive Party candidate but lose to independent candidate, Srish Chandra Goho (S C Goho).
In 1949, Rajah was elected a city councillor.
In 1953, Rajah represented Singapore to attend the Coronation of Queen Elizabeth II.
In 1959, Rajah re-entered politics as an independent candidate and was elected to the Legislative Assembly for Farrer Park.
He lost his seat in 1963, but was appointed the Speaker of the Legislative Assembly of Singapore in 1964.
In 1965, after Singapore gained independence, the Legislative Assembly of Singapore was renamed the Parliament of Singapore and he became the first Speaker of the Parliament.

In 1966, Rajah was appointed as the High Commissioner to UK.
Between 1971 and 1973, he was appointed as the High Commissioner to Australia and Fiji.

Rajah returned to Singapore in 1973 to resume legal practice, and was later appointed as a Supreme Court judge on 1 October 1976. He held the appointment till he retired on 30 September 1990 at the age of 79.

Rajah was the Pro-Chancellor of National University of Singapore from 1990 to 1999.

Family and death
Rajah died on 28 September 1999. His wife, Vijaya Lakshmi had died before him in 1971. He was survived by his son Chelva and daughter Mala.

References

1911 births
1999 deaths
20th-century Singaporean judges
Speakers of the Parliament of Singapore